The Women's team time trial of the 2014 UCI Road World Championships took place in and around Ponferrada, Spain on 21 September 2014. It was the third edition of the team time trial event for UCI Women's Teams.  was the defending champion, having won both previous editions in 2012 and 2013.

 once again won the world title, finishing over a minute clear of their closest competitors, . The bronze medal went to Astana BePink, after  were severely delayed because of an incident that caused several members of the team to hit the ground.

Qualification

Invitations were sent to the 25 leading UCI Women's Teams in the UCI Team Ranking as of 15 August 2014. Teams that accepted the invitation within the deadline had the right to participate. Every participating team had the opportunity to register nine riders from its team roster, with the exception of stagiaires, and had to select six riders to compete in the event.

Teams that did not accept the invitation are listed below in italics.

Top 25 as of 15 August 2014

Course
The team time trial started in the centre of Ponferrada and passed through La Martina, Posada del Bierzo, Carracedelo and Cacabelos before returning to Ponferrada. A short stretch before riding into Ponferrada was made for the championships.

Schedule
All times are in Central European Time (UTC+1).

Prize money
The UCI assigned premiums for the top 5 finishers with a total prize money of €49,531.

Final classification

References

Women's team time trial
UCI Road World Championships – Women's team time trial
2014 in women's road cycling